The Skokomish Indian Tribe, formerly known as the Skokomish Indian Tribe of the Skokomish Reservation, and in its own official use the Skokomish Tribal Nation, is a federally recognized tribe of Skokomish, Twana, Klallam, and Chimakum people. They are a tribe of Southern Coast Salish indigenous people of the Pacific Northwest located in Washington. The Skokomish are one of nine bands of Twana people.

Reservation

Some Klallam people were relocated onto the reservation after signing the 1855 Point No Point Treaty.

Government
The Skokomish Indian Tribe is headquartered in Skokomish, Washington. The tribe is governed by a seven-member, democratically elected General Council. The current tribal administration is as follows:
 Chairman: Charles "Guy" Miller
 Vice-Chair: Terri Twiddy-Butler
 Secretary: Alex Gouley
 Council Member: Lyle Wilbur
 Council Member: Tim "Wiggs" LeClair
 Council Member: Annette Smith
 Council Member: Tom Strong
 General Council President: Gilanne "Sissy" Delacruz
 Executive Secretary: Bobbi Blacketer

Language
English is commonly spoken by the tribe. The Skokomish language is a dialect of Twana, a Central Salish language. The last fully fluent speaker died in 1980.

Economic development

As of April 2015, the Skokomish Tribe acquired the Glen Ayr resort, located north of Hoodsport, WA, along the Hood Canal.

Notes

References
 Pritzker, Barry M. A Native American Encyclopedia: History, Culture, and Peoples. Oxford: Oxford University Press, 2000. .
 Rebecca McLain, Skokomish Indian Tribe, Shelton, Washington - Academia.edu

External links
 Skokomish Tribal Nation, official website
 Constitution of the Skokomish Indian Tribe, 17 March 1980
 "Skokomish Tribe reclaims its land, breath", Seattle Times

Coast Salish governments
Native American tribes in Washington (state)
Federally recognized tribes in the United States
Indigenous peoples of the Pacific Northwest Coast